Mickey Lawson (born 23 May 1949 in Edinburgh) is a Scottish former association football player and manager. He played for Stirling Albion, St Johnstone, Raith Rovers, Berwick Rangers and Meadowbank Thistle, and has since managed league sides Arbroath and Meadowbank Thistle. He has also managed non-league sides Whitehill Welfare and Spartans.

Lawson was appointed Spartans manager in 2001, and won six trophies in his first two seasons with the club. He has since guided the club to significant Scottish Cup runs, and was in charge when they (unsuccessfully) applied for membership of the Scottish Football League in 2008.

References

External links 
 

1949 births
Living people
Footballers from Edinburgh
Association football forwards
Scottish footballers
Stirling Albion F.C. players
St Johnstone F.C. players
Raith Rovers F.C. players
Berwick Rangers F.C. players
Scottish Football League players
Scottish football managers
Arbroath F.C. managers
Livingston F.C. managers
Livingston F.C. players
Scottish Football League managers